John George Phillips may refer to:

 Jack Phillips (wireless officer) (John George Phillips, 1887–1912), chief wireless officer on the RMS Titanic
 John George Phillips (businessman) (1888–1964), president of IBM

See also
John Phillips (disambiguation)
Jack Phillips (disambiguation)